The Glen Building is a historic commercial building located at Cape Vincent in Jefferson County, New York.

Description and history 
It is a two-story, “L” shaped, wood-frame building with a low-pitched shed roof and Italianate detailing. It was built in 1887 as a combination family home and business. A small detached paint shop is also on the property.

It was listed on the National Register of Historic Places on September 27, 1985.

References

Commercial buildings on the National Register of Historic Places in New York (state)
Italianate architecture in New York (state)
Houses completed in 1887
Houses on the National Register of Historic Places in New York (state)
Buildings and structures in Jefferson County, New York
Houses in Jefferson County, New York
National Register of Historic Places in Jefferson County, New York